Lindbergtinden is a mountain in Lom Municipality in Innlandet county, Norway. The mountain is surrounded by several other notable mountains including Storjuvtinden and Store Tverråtinden to the north; Svellnosbreahesten and Midtre Tverråtinden to the northeast; Store Styggehøe and Bukkeholshøe to the southeast;Bukkeholstindene and Tverrbottindene to the south; and Sauhøi to the west.

See also
List of mountains of Norway by height

References

Jotunheimen
Lom, Norway
Mountains of Innlandet